Yvon Trèvédic (born 13 November 1902, date of death unknown) was a French boxer who competed in the 1924 Summer Olympics. In 1924 he was eliminated in the second round of the flyweight class after losing his fight to Oscar Bergström.

References

External links
profile

1902 births
Year of death missing
Flyweight boxers
Olympic boxers of France
Boxers at the 1924 Summer Olympics
French male boxers